Sergio Saavedra Viollier (13 July 1927 – 29 November 2022) was a Chilean engineer and politician. A member of the Christian Democratic Party, he served in the Chamber of Deputies from May to September 1973.

Saavedra died in Santiago on 29 November 2022.

References

1927 births
2022 deaths
20th-century Chilean politicians
Members of the Chamber of Deputies of Chile
Christian Democratic Party (Chile) politicians
University of Chile alumni
Politicians from Santiago